Metehan Güçlü (born 2 April 1999) is a professional footballer who plays as a forward for Eredivisie club FC Emmen. Born in France, he represents Turkey at international level.

Club career

Paris Saint-Germain 
Güçlü began his footballing career in the youth academy of AS Bondy at the age of 9, before moving to the Paris Saint-Germain Academy in 2012. He signed his first professional contract with Paris Saint-Germain on 21 February 2019.

On 17 April 2019, Güçlü made his professional debut by scoring a goal in PSG's 3–2 away loss to Nantes in Ligue 1. He replaced Layvin Kurzawa in the 74th minute of the game and netted his first goal 15 minutes later.

Rennes 
On 31 August 2019, Güçlü joined Rennes on a free transfer containing a sell-on percentage fee clause.

On 9 July 2020, Ligue 2 side Valenciennes announced the signing of Güçlü from Rennes on a season-long loan deal.

On 1 February 2022, Güçlü moved on loan to Dutch club Emmen. He signed for the club on a permanent transfer on 22 July.

International career
Güçlü was born in France and is of Turkish descent, and holds both passports. He is a youth international for Turkey.

Personal life
Güçlü's older brother, Ayhan Güçlü, is a former professional footballer and youth international for Turkey.

Career statistics

Honours
Paris Saint-Germain
Ligue 1: 2018–19

Emmen
Eerste Divisie: 2021–22

References

External links
 
 

Living people
1999 births
People from Montfermeil
Association football forwards
Turkish footballers
Turkey youth international footballers
French footballers
French people of Turkish descent
Paris Saint-Germain F.C. players
Stade Rennais F.C. players
Valenciennes FC players
FC Emmen players
Ligue 1 players
Ligue 2 players
Championnat National 2 players
Turkish expatriate footballers
Expatriate footballers in the Netherlands
Turkish expatriate sportspeople in the Netherlands